The Charles Playhouse is a theater at 74 Warrenton Street Boston in the Boston Theater District. The venue comprises an approximately 500-seat mainstage, which hosts the long-running Blue Man Group, and a 200-seat second stage that hosted Shear Madness until March 2020.

History
In 1957, the Charles Playhouse opened at 54 Charles Street. In 1958, the company moved to the current Warrenton Street location. The Warrenton Street building was originally built in 1839, as the Fifth Universalist Church from a design by architect Asher Benjamin. In 1864, it became the second home of Congregation Ohabei Shalom, the first synagogue in Boston. It was later transformed into a speakeasy called The Lido Venice, which became the Southland ballroom and cafe- featuring prominent jazz artists such as Count Basie, Duke Ellington, Cab Calloway, Jimmie Lunceford, and many others during the Jazz Age.

In 1958, the Charles Playhouse staged a revival of O'Neill's The Iceman Cometh. The founding artistic director, Michael Murray, led the company until 1968. The founder and managing director was Frank Sugrue. The acting company included many stars-to-be such as Al Pacino, Olympia Dukakis, Jill Clayburgh, Jane Alexander, Ned Beatty, and John Cazale. The company produced Boston premieres of plays by Brecht, Beckett, Osborne, and Ionesco, as well as classics by Shakespeare, Shaw, Ibsen, Pirandello, and others.

The Charles Playhouse was regarded as one of the pioneering regional theaters in America. In his book, Regional Theatre: the Revolutionary Stage, Joseph Wesley Zeigler identifies it as one of six theatres which were the foundations of the Regional Theatre Movement.

In 1995, Sugre sold the Charles Playhouse to Jon B. Platt, who operated the Colonial Theatre. In 1998, Platt sold his Boston theatres to SFX Entertainment (now Live Nation). In 2008, Live Nation sold most of its theatrical division, including the Charles Playhouse, to Key Brand Entertainment (now the John Gore Organization).

See also
National Register of Historic Places listings in northern Boston, Massachusetts

References

External links

 Boston Public Library, Special Collections. William B. Jackson Theater Collection. Includes materials related to the Charles Playhouse
Boston Public Library, Rare Books and Manuscripts Department. Charles Playhouse Collection, 1945-2003

Theatres on the National Register of Historic Places in Massachusetts
Buildings and structures in Boston
Theatres in Boston
1957 establishments in Massachusetts
Boston Theater District
Theatres completed in 1958
National Register of Historic Places in Boston
Religious buildings and structures completed in 1839
Event venues on the National Register of Historic Places in Massachusetts